ASDT may refer to:

 Associação Social-Democrata Timorense, a Timorese political party
 Average summer daily traffic, a traffic measure